Murat Karakoç (born 7 September 1979) is a Turkish retired professional footballer and later football manager.

References

External links
Coach profile at TFF

1979 births
Living people
Footballers from İzmir
Turkish footballers
Bucaspor footballers
Aydınspor footballers
Altay S.K. footballers
Manisaspor footballers
Karşıyaka S.K. footballers
Denizlispor footballers
Turgutluspor footballers
Association football wingers